David Duke Carr (born July 21, 1979) is an American former football quarterback who played 11 seasons in the National Football League (NFL). He played college football at Fresno State and was drafted by the first overall by the Houston Texans in the 2002 NFL Draft. Carr also played for the Carolina Panthers, New York Giants, and San Francisco 49ers. As a backup with the Giants, Carr received a Super Bowl ring after their victory over the New England Patriots in Super Bowl XLVI. 

Carr's status as a number one draft pick and subsequent career has led to him being considered a draft bust. In 2016, he joined the NFL Network as an analyst. Carr's younger brother Derek is also an NFL quarterback, having been drafted by the Oakland Raiders in 2014.

Early years
David Carr attended Valley Oak Elementary School in Fresno, California. He continued on to Clovis Unified's Kastner Intermediate School in Fresno, where he proceeded to break a number of California D-I middle school records as quarterback of the Thunderbirds. After moving to Bakersfield, California, Carr attended Stockdale High School.

College career
Carr began as the starting quarterback at Fresno State during the 2000 and 2001 seasons after redshirting in 1999. While he was quarterback, the Bulldogs went 7–5 and 11–3. In his senior season the team beat Colorado, Oregon State, and Wisconsin, all members of BCS conferences. There was speculation about whether the Bulldogs would qualify for a BCS bid, something then unheard of for a BCS non-automatic qualifying conference team. They climbed to as high as number 8 in the polls, and Carr was on the cover of Sports Illustrated. During his collegiate career, Carr completed 565 of 901 passes for 7,849 yards and threw 65 touchdowns versus 22 interceptions. During his senior year, he won the Johnny Unitas Golden Arm Award and was a finalist for the 2001 Heisman Trophy, finishing fifth.

On September 1, 2007, the Fresno State Bulldogs retired Carr's #8 jersey in his honor. Former Fresno State football player Robbie Rouse (a junior in 2011) was the last player allowed to wear the number.

College statistics

Professional career

Houston Texans

With the first overall pick of the 2002 NFL Draft, the Houston Texans, a new expansion team, selected Carr. His professional career began on a productive note. The Texans played their first regular season game on September 8, 2002, defeating the Dallas Cowboys, 19–10, at Houston's Reliant Stadium. Houston became just the second expansion team to win its first game. However, Carr was sacked 76 times during that season, which set a league record. He also set the NFL record for fumble recoveries in a single season, recovering 12 of his own. Both records still stand as of 2022. He finished his rookie year of 2002 with 2,592 passing yards, 9 touchdowns, and 15 interceptions. He also rushed for 282 yards along with 3 rushing touchdowns. The Texans finished 4–12 in their first franchise year.
In the 2003 season, Carr played 12 games (11 starts) with 2,103 passing yards, 9 touchdowns, and 13 interceptions. He also rushed for 151 yards with 2 rushing touchdowns and was sacked only 15 times. The Texans finished with a record of 5–11 in 2003.

Carr started all 16 games in 2004 being sacked a league-leading 49 times. He passed for 3,531 yards with 16 touchdowns and 14 interceptions. The Texans finished 7–9 in 2004.

The 2005 season began poorly as the Texans were 1–9 in their first 10 games, and plummeted to a 2–14 record to finish the season. Plagued by injuries and an ineffective offensive line that limited both the running and passing games, Carr still threw for 2,488 yards while being sacked a league-leading 68 times. Despite the drop-off, the Texans exercised an option in Carr's contract that extended him for three years.

The Texans finished the 2006 season at 6–10. For the season, Carr posted a completion percentage of 68.9% (a career-high) and tied the then single-game NFL record of 22 consecutive pass completions (against the Buffalo Bills). However, new Texans general manager Rick Smith decided to go in a different direction at quarterback. Thus, the Texans acquired Matt Schaub from the Atlanta Falcons and decided to release Carr, making him a free agent for the first time of his career. He had been sacked a total of 249 times during his tenure in Houston.

Carolina Panthers
Carr agreed to terms with the Carolina Panthers on April 6, 2007, signing a two-year, $6.2 million contract. Following an injury to starting quarterback Jake Delhomme, Carr was named the starter. He played in six games (started four games) and had three touchdowns and five interceptions, with a 53.7 completion percentage and a passer rating of 58.3. Carr suffered a back injury during the fifth game of the season (a victory vs. the New Orleans Saints) on a sack by Will Smith, and saw limited action during the remainder of the 2007 season, being replaced by Vinny Testaverde and Matt Moore. He was released on February 27, 2008.

New York Giants
On March 12, 2008, Carr signed a one-year contract with the New York Giants, reuniting with former Houston offensive coordinator Chris Palmer. Subsequently, the Giants released former backup quarterback Jared Lorenzen. Carr backed up Eli Manning for two seasons. In the 2009 offseason, Carr was re-signed to a one-year, $2 million contract on February 9, 2009. In his first two years with the Giants, Carr saw action in seven games and threw three total touchdown passes.

San Francisco 49ers

On March 7, 2010, Carr agreed to terms with the San Francisco 49ers; he served as a backup to Alex Smith. Carr was put into the 49ers Week 7 game against his former team the Carolina Panthers after Smith suffered a shoulder injury. Carr struggled completing only 5 of 13 passes for 67 yards and throwing a crucial interception late in the 4th quarter. He was released by the 49ers on July 28, 2011.

New York Giants (second stint)
Carr signed with the New York Giants on July 31, 2011, as the backup quarterback to starter Eli Manning. Carr received his only Super Bowl ring in the 2011 season after the Giants beat the New England Patriots 21-17 in Super Bowl XLVI. He did not play a single snap during the 2011 regular season. Carr re-signed with the Giants on March 14, 2012, to an additional one-year contract. He was waived by the Giants on August 31, 2013.

Legacy
Carr's status as a number one draft pick and subsequent career has led to him being considered a draft bust. In 2011, he was included in Foxsports.com's list of the ten worst No. 1 overall picks in NFL Draft history. In 2015, NESN ranked Carr as the 8th worst No. 1 overall pick in NFL Draft history.  He is currently on NFL Network as an analyst.

NFL career statistics

Coaching career
In 2015, Carr became offensive coordinator at Bakersfield Christian High School, under head coach and younger brother Darren Carr.

Personal life
Carr married high school girlfriend Melody Tipton in March 1999. Together they have five children, three of whom have been diagnosed with Type 1 diabetes, which Carr also suffers from.

His brother, Derek is also a quarterback in the NFL. Derek states that David was instrumental to the preparation and training that led up to the 2014 NFL Draft and has helped greatly with training and experience since being drafted.

Lon Boyett, his uncle, played in the NFL as a tight end with the 49ers in 1978.

See also
 List of NCAA major college football yearly passing leaders
 List of NCAA major college football yearly total offense leaders

References

External links

 
 Fresno State profile

1979 births
Living people
Players of American football from Bakersfield, California
American football quarterbacks
Fresno State Bulldogs football players
National Football League first-overall draft picks
Houston Texans players
Carolina Panthers players
New York Giants players
San Francisco 49ers players
High school football coaches in California
Alliance of American Football announcers